George Mendeluk (born March 20, 1948, in Augsburg, Bavaria) is a German-born Canadian film director, television director and writer of Ukrainian descent.

Throughout his career he has amassed a number of credits in film and television. His directorial television credits include Miami Vice, Night Heat, The New Alfred Hitchcock Presents, The Young Riders, Counterstrike, Kung Fu: The Legend Continues, Hercules: The Legendary Journeys, Poltergeist: The Legacy, Highlander: The Series, Highlander: The Raven, Queen of Swords, First Wave, Relic Hunter, Romeo!, Odyssey 5 and among other series.

Since 2006, Mendeluk has focused primarily on directing television films namely Deck the Halls (2005) starring Gabrielle Carteris and Judicial Indiscretion (2007) starring Anne Archer and Michael Shanks.

Mendeluk directed the 2017 epic romantic-drama film Bitter Harvest, depicting Holodomor, the man-made genocide in 1930s Ukraine that Joseph Stalin  methodically planned to starve 5 to 10 million Ukrainians to death. The story and original script was written by Richard Bachynsky Hoover a Kingston Ontario raised Canadian half Ukrainian living in Kyiv Ukraine raising his young son Yevhen Nyanchenko born in Smila Cherkashyna which is portrayed as a tribute to his son and his mothers family as the Cossack farming village in the film where many thousands of Ukrainians had died of hunger in that region as well the river Tyasmin nearby where the film opens up with Yuri and Natalka swimming as children as Richards own son did with him and his sons family as a little boy raising him there his first few years . The writer Richard Bachynsky Hoover who was also the Executive producer credited for finding the film's financing investor and had Mendeluk attached and scouted most locations and casting and film crews  in Kyiv for the project had later sent Mendeluk his script and had him  hired as the film's director by his Toronto Canadian Ukrainian  backer producer Ian Ihnatowycz.  After reading Bachynsky Hoovers original screenplay material director Mendeluk was thrilled to direct the film for them.

Filmography
 1979 Stone Cold Dead
 1980 The Kidnapping of the President
 1985 Doin' Time
 1986 Meatballs III: Summer Job
 2005 Deck The Halls
 2017 Bitter Harvest

References

External links

1948 births
Canadian film directors
Canadian film producers
Canadian people of Ukrainian descent
Canadian television directors
Canadian television writers
German emigrants to Canada
Canadian male television writers
Living people
Canadian male screenwriters
20th-century Canadian screenwriters
21st-century Canadian screenwriters